Tamás Artner (born 25 April 1970) is a Hungarian football manager.

On 8 July 2005, Artner was appointed as the manager of the Hungarian League club Szombathelyi Haladás.

References

1970 births
Living people
Hungarian football managers
Szombathelyi Haladás football managers
Zalaegerszegi TE managers
Nemzeti Bajnokság I managers
Dunaújváros FC managers